Karolina Kaczorowska (born name: Karolina Mariampolska; 26 September 1930 – 21 August 2021) was the widow of Ryszard Kaczorowski, the last President of the Republic of Poland in exile, and thus the last emigree First Lady (1989–1990).

During the Soviet occupation (1939–1941) she was deported, along with her family, to Siberia. After being released, she attended Polish school in Uganda and graduated from the University of London. For a number of years, she worked as a schoolteacher and was active in the Polish exiled Scouting movement, where she met her future husband. They married on 19 July 1952. Karolina and Ryszard had 2 daughters, as well as 5 grandchildren.

Kaczorowska was originally due to attend the 70th anniversary of the Katyn massacre along with her husband, but health reasons prevented her from going. The entire Polish delegation, including former President Kaczorowski, were killed in the 2010 Polish Air Force Tu-154 crash.

References

1930 births
2021 deaths
Alumni of the University of London
First Ladies of Poland
Polish emigrants to the United Kingdom
Polish Scouts and Guides
Polish schoolteachers
People from Stanisławów Voivodeship
20th-century Polish women